Baldwin of Antioch (died September 17, 1176) was a Frankish knight and general in service of the Byzantine Empire during the Byzantine–Seljuk Wars. He was the son of Princess Constance of Antioch and Raymond of Poitiers. His brother-in-law was Byzantine Emperor Manuel I Komnenos. An ally of the Emperor in his battles against the Seljuk Turks, Baldwin was one of his most trusted advisors and the only one of Manuel's senior commanders "of Western origin".

Baldwin commanded the right wing of the Byzantine forces guarding the siege and baggage train, largely composed of Latin mercenaries, at the Battle of Myriokephalon on September 17, 1176. Upon approaching narrow Tzibritze Pass, the Seljuks launched an attack on Manuel's marching troops. Baldwin led a cavalry charge attempting to drive the Turks from the hills in a counterattack but was surrounded and killed together with all his men.

In Byzantium: The Decline and Fall (1996), English historian John Julius Norwich described the aftermath of Baldwin's death (taken from the Byzantine historian Choniates, whose comments are not always unbiased);

References

Further reading
Angold, Michael. The Byzantine Empire, 1025-1204: A Political History. London and New York: Longman, 1984. 
Birkenmeier, John W. The Development of the Komnenian Army: 1081-1180. Leiden, Boston, and Koln: EJ Brill, 2002. 

Year of birth missing
1176 deaths
Christians of the Second Crusade
12th-century Byzantine military personnel
Byzantine generals
Frankish warriors
Medieval French knights
Byzantines killed in battle